Fort Stevenson State Park is a public recreation area located on a peninsula on Lake Sakakawea  south of the community of Garrison in McLean County, North Dakota. The state park's  include a partial reconstruction of Fort Stevenson, the 19th-century Missouri River fort from which the park takes its name. The site of the original fort lies about two miles southwest, below the waters of Lake Sakakawea.

Activities and amenities
The park offers fishing, boating, camping, and picnicking. It has more than eight miles of non-motorized trails for hiking, biking, and cross-country skiing. A half-mile trail winds through the park arboretum. Boaters can rent slips at two marinas. For overnight stays, the park offers cabins and campground.

References

External links

Fort Stevens State Park North Dakota Parks and Recreation Department
Fort Stevens State Park Map North Dakota Parks and Recreation Department

State parks of North Dakota
Protected areas established in 1974
1974 establishments in North Dakota
Protected areas of McLean County, North Dakota
Museums in McLean County, North Dakota
Military and war museums in North Dakota